Alpine School District is the primary school district in northern Utah County, Utah, United States

The district covers Alpine, American Fork, Cedar Fort, Cedar Hills, Eagle Mountain, Fairfield, Highland, Lehi, Lindon, Orem, Pleasant Grove, Saratoga Springs, and Vineyard (as well as the portion of Draper that is located within Utah County).

The district includes all grades from kindergarten through high school (K-12). As of 2019, there were 59 elementary schools, 13 junior high schools, 10 high schools, and 8 special purpose schools serving approximately 78,659 students, making it the largest school district in Utah.

Structure 
The district is governed by a board of education which consists of a seven-member group of citizens elected to four-year terms. The day-to-day operations of the district are managed by a superintendent. , the district superintendent is Shane Farnsworth.

The district currently has ten large high schools, and only seven school board members, leading some parents and students to express concerns over inadequate representation on the school board.  Some parents would like to see the district split into two or three new school districts, allowing more direct control over their local schools.  Right now, a member of the Alpine School Board represents more people than a member of the state legislature in the house.

The district offices are located in American Fork. The district boundary includes: American Fork, Alpine, Cedar Fort, Cedar Hills, Eagle Mountain, Fairfield, Highland, Lehi, Lindon, Orem Pleasant Grove, Saratoga Springs, Sundance, and Vineyard. It also includes portions of Provo and the Utah County portions of Bluffdale and Draper.

List of schools

Elementary schools

 Alpine (Alpine)
 Aspen (Orem)
 Barratt (American Fork)
 Belmont (Lehi)
 Black Ridge (Eagle Mountain)
 Bonneville (Orem)
 Brookhaven (Eagle Mountain)
 Cascade (Orem)
 Cedar Ridge (Cedar Hills)
 Cedar Valley (Cedar Fort)
 Centennial (Orem)
 Central (Pleasant Grove)
 Cherry Hill (Orem)
 Deerfield (Cedar Hills)
 Dry Creek (Lehi)
 Eagle Valley (Eagle Mountain)
 Eaglecrest (Lehi)
 Foothill (Orem)
 Forbes (American Fork)
 Fox Hollow (Lehi)
 Freedom (Highland)
 Geneva (Orem)
 Greenwood (American Fork)
 Grovecrest (Pleasant Grove)
 Harvest (Saratoga Springs)
 Hidden Hollow (Eagle Mountain)
 Highland (Highland)
 Legacy (American Fork)
 Lehi (Lehi)
 Liberty Hills (Lehi)
 Lindon (Lindon)
 Manila (Pleasant Grove)
 Meadow (Lehi)
 Mount Mahogany (Pleasant Grove)
 Mountain Trails (Eagle Mountain)
 North Point (Lehi)
 Northridge (Orem)
 Orchard (Orem)
 Orem (Orem)
 Pony Express (Eagle Mountain)
 Ridgeline (Highland)
 Riverview (Saratoga Springs)
 River Rock (Lehi)
 Rocky Mountain (Lindon)
 Sage Hills (Saratoga Springs)
 Saratoga Shores (Saratoga Springs)
 Sego Lily (Lehi)
 Sharon (Orem)
 Shelley (American Fork)
 Snow Springs (Lehi)
 Springside (Saratoga Springs)
 Suncrest (Orem)
 Thunder Ridge (Saratoga Springs)
 Traverse Mountain (Lehi)
 Valley View (Pleasant Grove)
 Vineyard (Vineyard)
 Westfield (Alpine)
 Westmore (Orem)
 Windsor (Orem)

Junior high/middle schools

 American Fork Junior High (American Fork)
 Canyon View Junior High (Orem)
 Frontier Middle School (Eagle Mountain)
 Lake Mountain (Saratoga Springs)
 Lakeridge (Orem)
 Lehi Junior High School (Lehi)
 Mountain Ridge Junior High School (Highland)
 Oak Canyon Junior High (Lindon)
 Orem Junior High (Orem)
 Pleasant Grove Junior High (Pleasant Grove)
 Timberline Middle School (Alpine)
 Vista Heights Middle School (Saratoga Springs)
 Willowcreek Middle School (Lehi)

High schools

 American Fork High School (American Fork)
 Cedar Valley High School (Eagle Mountain)
 Lehi High School (Lehi)
 Lone Peak High School (Highland)
 Mountain View High School (Orem)
 Orem High School (Orem)
 Pleasant Grove High School (Pleasant Grove)
 Skyridge High School (Lehi)
 Timpanogos High School (Orem)
 Westlake High School (Saratoga Springs)

Alternative schools

 Alpine Adult Education
 Alpine Online K-8
 ATEC
 Dan Peterson (severely disabled students) (American Fork)
 East Shore (online school and alternative school) (American Fork)
 Horizon
 Polaris High School (alternative school) (American Fork)
 Summit (alternative school) (American Fork)

History
The district was created in 1915 with 92 teachers, 4,906 students, 21 grade schools, and four high schools: Lehi High School, American Fork High School, Pleasant Grove High School (Utah), and Spencer (Orem).

Its name and original boundaries were taken from the Alpine Stake of the Church of Jesus Christ of Latter-day Saints.

Book banning
In the summer of 2022, Alpine School District made headlines after removing 52 books by 41 authors from school libraries, 42% of which “feature LBGTQ+ characters and or themes.” Another 32 books will be subjected for cover-to-cover review with actions to be taken in the fall.

A total of 275 books were initially selected for review following the implementation of a new law, H.B. 374, “Sensitive Materials In Schools," but the majority of the books were found to have no objectionable content. All 275 books had previously received parental complaints and urging from Utah Parents United saying the titles "are inappropriate for children." Following guidance from the Office of the Attorney General, "an internal library audit determined that [the banned books] contain 'sensitive material' ... and 'do not have literary merit.'" In addition to removing the books from school libraries, Utah Parents United curriculum director Brooke Stephens "also filed a police report ... to report a list of 47 books" she claimed to contain pornographic material according to the new law.

According to the Utah Library Association (ULA), however, “removal of these...books does not seem to be in accordance with the law." ULA president Marissa Bischoff noted that some of the banned books "have been found to have literary value in other challenges across the country.”  She also noted that the review was hastily done, saying “The way they talked about it at the board meeting, they didn't actually read the books."

Utah Parents United, as well as other conservative groups, have applauded the books' removal. One parent, who has been working with Alpine Parents for Prosperity, has celebrated the removal, saying he "believes the decision to remove the books saved the district thousands of dollars in penalties for breaking the law that bans pornography in schools."

Alpine spokesperson David Stephenson indicated that the books have been temporarily "placed away from students (who are currently out for summer break) until Alpine can conduct a 'review of content.'" Free speech "advocates are speaking out, saying it is a violation to remove the books before [the internal review of content] — especially when many of the titles are about historically marginalized groups, including the LGBTQ community and authors of color."

The director of free expression and education programs and PEN America, Jonathan Friedman, said, "Sweeping removals of books are not supposed to be a routine thing in school libraries. Students have a right to learn about the variety of human experiences and perspectives that these books provide. Serious questions remain about how this decision was arrived at, and whether state statutes were properly applied.”

Paisley Rekdal, the chapter leader for PEN America Utah, called the action "a grave and disappointing mistake," saying, "Banning books that tackle the complexity of sexuality, gender, identity, and young adulthood out of the misguided fear that younger readers can’t distinguish between fact and fiction, and won’t be able to comprehend and even critique for themselves any idea that challenges them is both patronizing and naïve. People long for more, not less complexity, and young readers should be given the texts—and tools—that allow them to navigate the world they actually live in.”

Further, free speech advocates have noted that "examples of sex in the books on the list ... aren’t about titillation." Dr. Richard Price, "an associate professor of political science at Weber State University who tracks censorship in school districts," has discussed how these often banned books "are about relationship imbalances and manipulation — often real experiences from the authors that are meant to show the reader how the situation is wrong and warn them if they are going through something similar." Price continued by saying, “It’s about figuring our where your boundaries are and drawing them. That’s very healthy.”

See also
 List of school districts in Utah
 Nebo School District
 Provo City School District

References

External links 

 
 Interactive District Map

School districts in Utah
Education in Utah County, Utah
School districts established in 1915
1915 establishments in Utah
American Fork, Utah